Tapanuli Atletik Football Club (simply known as TATL or Tapanuli Atletik) is an Indonesian football club based in North Tapanuli Regency, North Sumatra. They currently compete in the Liga 3 and their homeground is Serbaguna Stadium.

References

External links
Tapanuli Atletik Instagram

Football clubs in Indonesia
Football clubs in North Sumatra
Association football clubs established in 2018
2018 establishments in Indonesia